Hideharu is a masculine Japanese given name. Notable people with the name include:

, Japanese daimyō
, Japanese ski jumper

Japanese masculine given names